The 2022 Bolivian Primera División season, known as the 2022 Copa Tigo season for sponsorship reasons, was the 45th season of the División Profesional del Fútbol Boliviano, Bolivia's top-flight football league and the fifth season under División de Fútbol Profesional management. The season began on 4 February and was scheduled to end on 13 November 2022.

In the Torneo Apertura, Bolívar won their thirtieth league title and twenty-fourth in the professional era, by defeating crosstown rivals The Strongest in the final match played on 12 June by a 3–0 score. On the other hand, the Torneo Clausura was abandoned on 10 November 2022 with 24 out of 30 rounds played and no champion was declared due to civil unrest in the Santa Cruz Department. Independiente Petrolero were the defending champions, having won the 2021 tournament.

Format
The format for the 2022 season was approved by the 16 División Profesional clubs on 21 December 2021. The league returned to the Apertura and Clausura format after the year-long tournament held in 2021 due to the COVID-19 pandemic. The Torneo Apertura, which was played from 6 February to 12 June, had a first stage with the 16 participating clubs divided into two groups of eight, from which the top four clubs of each group advanced to a knockout stage in which the champions were decided. Meanwhile, the Torneo Clausura, played from 1 July to 10 November, was played under a double round-robin format.

The distribution of international berths was confirmed on 11 January 2022. The champions of both tournaments, as well as the Torneo Clausura runners-up and the best placed team in the aggregate table would qualify for the 2023 Copa Libertadores, while the Torneo Apertura runners-up, the Copa Bolivia champions, and the next two best placed teams in the aggregate table would qualify for the 2023 Copa Sudamericana.

Teams
16 teams competed in the league for the 2022 season, 14 of which took part in 2021. The 2021 Copa Simón Bolívar champions Universitario de Vinto and the winners of the promotion/relegation play-off Universitario de Sucre, were both promoted for this season. The former competed in the top tier for the first time ever, while the latter returned after a 3-year absence. The promoted teams replaced Real Potosí and San José, who were relegated at the end of the previous season.

Stadia and locations

Managerial changes

Notes

Torneo Apertura

First stage

Standings

Serie A

Serie B

Results

Knockout stage

Bracket

Quarter-finals

|}

First leg

Second leg

Semi-finals

|}

First leg

Second leg

Final

Top scorers

Source: Soccerway

Torneo Clausura
The Torneo Clausura, which was originally scheduled to begin on 24 June, had its start date pushed back to 1 July due to technical issues for the implementation of VAR. The tournament was scheduled to end on 13 November 2022, but it was suspended on 21 October with six rounds to go due to civil unrest in the Santa Cruz Department and officially abandoned on 10 November 2022 in a meeting of the División Profesional's Higher Council. As a result, no champion nor runner-up were declared.

Standings

Results

Top scorers

Source: Soccerway

Aggregate table
Due to the abandonment of the Torneo Clausura, the berths for international tournaments for the following season were awarded through aggregate table placement. In addition to this, the División Profesional's Higher Council decided that the bottom-placed team in this table at the moment the Clausura tournament was abandoned would play the relegation play-off and no teams would be directly relegated to the Bolivian Football Regional Leagues.

Promotion/relegation play-off
The relegation play-off was played by:
 Universitario de Sucre (2022 División Profesional aggregate table 16th place)
 Libertad Gran Mamoré (2022 Copa Simón Bolívar runners-up)

The winners will play in the top flight for the 2023 season.

Libertad Gran Mamoré won 6–0 on aggregate and were promoted to the Bolivian Primera División. Universitario de Sucre were relegated to the Chuquisaca Football Association Championship.

See also
2022 Copa Bolivia

References

External links
 División Profesional on the FBF's official website 

2022
P
Bolivia